Cold Warrior is a British television series produced by the BBC in 1984.

The series was based around the character of Captain Aubrey Percival (Michael Denison), first introduced in the 1981 thriller serial Blood Money. Moving away from the serial format of Blood Money and Skorpion, Cold Warrior was a series of eight stand-alone episodes, which saw Percival dealing with various threats to national security. He was assisted by Jo (Lucy Fleming) and Danny Quirk (Dean Harris) - the latter also reprising his role from Blood Money.

Cast

 Michael Denison - Captain Aubrey Percival
 Lucy Fleming - Jo
 Dean Harris - Danny Quirk
 David Swift - Sir William Logie

Episodes

References

External links
 

1980s British drama television series
BBC television dramas
1984 British television series debuts
1984 British television series endings
1980s British television miniseries
English-language television shows